Joanne Zapanta Santos-Quintas (born October 27, 1976) is a Filipino actress and former beauty queen who won the Binibining Pilipinas Universe 1995 crown at the age of 18, participating in Miss Universe 1995.

Early life
Prior to Binibining Pilipinas, Quintas started her modeling career at age 12, becoming the image of Filipino clothing company Pink Soda and appearing in the film Massacre Files in 1994.

Binibining Pilipinas
After actress Charlene Gonzales' Top 6 Finish at Miss Universe 1994 and Ruffa Gutierrez's Second Runner-up placement at Miss World 1993, Quintas aimed to replicate their success stories in her country's national beauty pageant, Binibining Pilipinas, participating at age 18.

She succeeded in her efforts and was crowned Binibining Pilipinas 1995 on March 12, gaining the right to represent her country in Miss Universe 1995.

Miss Universe
As the official representative of her country to the 1995 Miss Universe pageant, broadcast live from Windhoek, Namibia on May 12, 1995, she placed 16th in the preliminary competition, coming 9th in the preliminary evening gown event.

Life after Binibining Pilipinas
Quintas continued working as a model and actress in several television shows and movies, never forgetting her success as a beauty queen, winning the titles of Miss Tourism International 1997 and Mrs. Philippines World in 2003.

A decade after she started modeling, she married Domini Primero and has three children with him: Rafael, Mulawin and Mayumi. In 2006, she started studying photography, later becoming famous for her work behind the camera.

In 2009, she was involved in a minor controversy with political candidate Joey Marquez when they were seen together as part of her work as a photographer for his political campaign. Both parties clarified the situation and moved on with their lives.

Filmography

Film

Television

References

External links
Official Binibining Pilipinas website - Past Titleholders

1976 births
Actresses from Manila
Binibining Pilipinas winners
Filipino female models
Filipino film actresses
Filipino television actresses
Living people
Miss Universe 1995 contestants